David Bhana (born 13 January 1993) is a New Zealand professional rugby league footballer. He previously played for the Newcastle Knights in the National Rugby League.

Background
Born in Auckland, New Zealand, Bhana is of Indian, and Māori descent and played his junior rugby league for the Northcote Tigers, before being signed by the New Zealand Warriors. He attended Birkenhead College between 2006 and 2010, where he was the Head Boy and continued to play club rugby league, while playing 1st XV for the school. Along with 1st XV, he also represented the school in 1st XI cricket. He then went on to study at the University of Auckland where he was a member of the University of Auckland Māori association, Ngā Tauira Māori. He went on to graduate with a Bachelor of Science majoring in Environmental Science and Geography.

Bhana's family has a long history in the game, with his grandfather, father and his three brothers having played rugby league.

Playing career

Early career
From 2012 to 2013, Bhana played for the New Zealand Warriors' NYC team. On 13 October 2012, he played for the Junior Kiwis against the Junior Kangaroos. In 2013, he captained the side, including in the 30-42 2013 NYC Grand Final loss to the Penrith Panthers. On 27 August 2013, he was named on the interchange bench in the 2013 NYC Team of the Year. On 13 October 2013, he captained the Junior Kiwis against the Junior Kangaroos, in which the Kiwis went down 26–38. In 2014, he graduated on to the Warriors' New South Wales Cup team. On 3 November 2015, he signed a 2-year contract with the Newcastle Knights starting in 2016.

2016
In round 1 of the 2016 NRL season, Bhana made his NRL debut for the Knights against the Gold Coast Titans.

He was named in the New Zealand Māori squad for a match against the New Zealand Residents on 15 October 2016.

2017
In April, Bhana suffered a severe knee injury while playing for the Knights' Intrust Super Premiership NSW team. The injury required multiple surgeries including an anterior cruciate ligament reconstruction, ruling him out for the remainder of the season. The injury prevented him from playing another game for the Knights as he was not offered a new contract beyond 2017.

References

External links
Newcastle Knights profile

1993 births
Living people
New Zealand rugby league players
New Zealand Māori rugby league players
New Zealand sportspeople of Indian descent
New Zealand people of Scottish descent
Newcastle Knights players
Junior Kiwis players
Northcote Tigers players
Auckland rugby league team players
Rugby league locks
Rugby league players from Auckland